The Butler School was a historic school building at 812 Gorham Street in Lowell, Massachusetts. It was used by the Lowell Public Schools.

The school, named after Benjamin F. Butler, a longtime Lowell resident, Massachusetts Governor, and Civil War general, was built in 1882 and added to the National Register of Historic Places in 1995. Vacant since 1994, the building deteriorated.  In May 2013, demolition began on the vacant building, and two new business buildings will be constructed on the lot.

A new Butler School facility was built further up Gorham Street in 1992.

See also

National Register of Historic Places listings in Lowell, Massachusetts

References

External links
 Lowell Historical Board

School buildings on the National Register of Historic Places in Massachusetts
Schools in Lowell, Massachusetts
National Register of Historic Places in Lowell, Massachusetts
School buildings completed in 1882
1882 establishments in Massachusetts